Okle Green is a village in Gloucestershire, England.

Villages in Gloucestershire